Macklin or MacKlin is a surname, derived ultimately from the Irish Mac Gille Eoin.  Notable people with the surname include:

 Bill Macklin. American lawyer, judge, and politician
 Carmel Macklin, American actress
 Charles Macklin, 18th century Irish actor
 David Macklin, American football player
 David Macklin (rower), British Olympic rower
 Gordon Macklin, American businessman
 Jenny Macklin, Australian politician
 John Macklin, American athlete, coach, and administrator
 Lance Macklin, British racing driver
 Matthew Macklin, British-Irish boxer
 Paul Macklin, Canadian politician and lawyer
 Rudy Macklin (born 1958), American basketball player
 Thomas Macklin, 18th century British publisher
 Thomas Eyre Macklin (1867–1943), British sculptor
 Vernon Macklin, American basketball player

See also
 Maclean, Clan MacLean for Scottish form
Macklyn, a given name

References

Surnames